The Commonwealth Chair-in-Office (CIO) is the Chair-in-Office of the Commonwealth of Nations, and is one of the main leadership positions in the Commonwealth.  It is held by the host chairperson of the previous Commonwealth Heads of Government Meeting (CHOGM), and is maintained until the next CHOGM. Currently, the incumbent Chair-in-Office is also the President of Rwanda.

Overview
The primary responsibility of the Chair-in-Office is to host the CHOGM, but their roles can be expanded.  For example, after the 2002 CHOGM, the incumbent, previous, and next Chairmen-in-Office formed a troika in an attempt to resolve the ongoing dispute over Zimbabwe's membership of the Commonwealth.

The position was created after the 1999 CHOGM, with Thabo Mbeki becoming the first Chair-in-Office.  However, Mbeki did very little to develop the position, leaving it virtually vacant until the next CHOGM in 2002, when the troika was created.  Even after John Howard became Chair, the troika's first meeting was in London, in the presence of the Commonwealth Secretary-General. The third Chair, Olusegun Obasanjo, did more to invigorate the role of the position after taking over in 2003.

From the assumption of the role at the 2009 CHOGM, representatives from Trinidad and Tobago, including the Prime Ministers, attended Commonwealth meetings, including 2011 Commonwealth Day celebrations where Kamla Persad-Bissessar, the first woman to chair the Commonwealth, gave the keynote address. Sri Lanka was due to host the Commonwealth Economic Forum in 2011 but it was held instead in Perth, Western Australia, due to accusations of war crimes committed during the Sri Lankan Civil War.

As Prime Minister of Australia, Julia Gillard succeeded Persad-Bissessar as the second female Chair at the 2011 CHOGM. Julia Gillard was in-turn succeeded by Kevin Rudd after she resigned as Prime Minister of Australia on 27 June 2013. Rudd went on to lose the Australian federal election in September 2013, and consequently was succeeded as Commonwealth's CiO by the new prime minister Tony Abbott. Abbott remained in the position until Commonwealth leaders met for the 23rd time on 15 November 2013, where he was succeeded by the President of Sri Lanka Mahinda Rajapaksa, who was succeeded by Maithripala Sirisena in 2015.

List of chairs-in-office

Footnotes

Chairs-in-Office